Sean Chandler (born April 27, 1996) is an American football safety for the Carolina Panthers of the National Football League (NFL). He played college football at Temple and signed with the New York Giants as an undrafted free agent in 2018.

Early years
Chandler grew up in Camden, New Jersey and attended Brimm Medical Arts High School, which did not offer sports teams; as such, under district policy, he played football for Camden High School, where he was named the Philadelphia Inquirer Defensive Player of the Year in 2013 after accumulating eight interceptions as a senior.

College career

Chandler was considered a three-star recruit by Rivals.com and chose Temple over an offer from Rutgers.

At Temple, Chandler played his freshman and sophomore seasons as a starting cornerback before becoming Temple's starting safety as a junior and senior. Chandler was an all-conference selection in 2015, 2016 and 2017. During his time at Temple, Chandler had 264 tackles, 13 tackles for a loss and 10 interceptions in 49 games.

Professional career
Coming out of Temple, Chandler was invited to the NFL Scouting Combine and was projected to be either a late-round or priority undrafted free agent selection in the 2018 NFL Draft.

New York Giants
After going undrafted in the 2018 NFL Draft, Chandler signed with the New York Giants as a rookie free agent on May 10, 2018. After a strong preseason, Chandler made the Giant's final 53-man roster.

On November 5, 2019, Chandler was waived by the Giants and re-signed to the practice squad. On December 10, he was re-signed to the active roster.

On September 6, 2020, Chandler was waived by the Giants, and was signed to the team's practice squad two days later. He was elevated to the active roster on September 14 for the team's week 1 game against the Pittsburgh Steelers, and reverted to the practice squad the next day. He was elevated again on September 19 for the team's week 2 game against the Chicago Bears, and reverted to the practice squad again after the game. He was promoted to the active roster on October 2, 2020, but waived four days later and re-signed to the practice squad on October 8.

Carolina Panthers
On October 23, 2020, Chandler was signed by the Carolina Panthers off the Giants practice squad. He was reunited with Panthers' head coach Matt Rhule, who previously served as his head coach at Temple. Chandler was waived by the Panthers on November 21, 2020, and re-signed to the practice squad three days later. He signed a reserve/future contract with the Panthers on January 4, 2021.

On March 15, 2022, Chandler signed a one-year contract extension with the Panthers.

Chandler was suspended the first two games of the 2023 season for violating the league’s policy on performance-enhancing substances.

References

External links
Temple Owls bio
New York Giants bio

Living people
1996 births
Players of American football from Camden, New Jersey
American football safeties
Camden High School (New Jersey) alumni
Temple Owls football players
New York Giants players
Carolina Panthers players